Luv Is Rage 2 is the debut studio album by American rapper Lil Uzi Vert. It was released on August 25, 2017, through Generation Now and Atlantic Records. The album serves as a sequel to Uzi's commercial debut mixtape Luv Is Rage (2015). It features guest appearances from The Weeknd and Pharrell Williams.

Luv Is Rage 2 was supported by three singles: "XO Tour Llif3", "The Way Life Goes" and "Sauce It Up". The album debuted at number one on the US Billboard 200 with 135,000 album-equivalent units, and received positive reviews from most critics.

Background
In November 2016, Lil Uzi Vert initially announced Luv Is Rage 2 that would suffer from numerous delays amid confusion. In February 2017, Lil Uzi released an extended play (EP), Luv Is Rage 1.5 containing four tracks for streaming on SoundCloud. It serves as a prequel for Luv Is Rage 2; as well as Uzi previewing snippets of those songs online throughout the whole year. In July 2017, DJ Drama and Don Cannon premiered five songs on their Shade 45 radio show, which were not to be included on the album. On August 24, 2017, Lil Uzi unexpectedly announced the release of Luv Is Rage 2 a day before release via social media, including the cover art and track listing.

Release and promotion
Luv Is Rage 2 was released on August 25, 2017, for streaming and digital download. The deluxe edition of the album was released on November 17, 2017, and included four bonus tracks: "Skir Skirr", "Loaded", "Diamonds All on My Wrist" and "20 Min". The album was released a few days later in Japan, with two additional tracks: "Money Longer" and "Do What I Want", both originally featured on Lil Uzi Vert vs. the World and The Perfect LUV Tape, respectively.

Singles
"XO Tour Llif3" was released for free streaming as the album's lead single on March 24, 2017. The song was originally included on Lil Uzi's prequel extended play (EP), Luv Is Rage 1.5 (2017). The song was produced by TM88 and JW Lucas. The song peaked at number seven on the US Billboard Hot 100.

"The Way Life Goes" was released as the album's second single to urban contemporary radio on October 3, 2017. The remix to the single was released on November 3, 2017, with a guest appearance from Trinidadian-American rapper Nicki Minaj.

"Sauce It Up" was released as the album's third single to urban contemporary radio on February 27, 2018.

Critical reception

Luv Is Rage 2 was met with generally positive reviews. At Metacritic, which assigns a normalized rating out of 100 to reviews from professional publications, the album received an average score of 75, based on eight reviews.

Scott Glaysher of XXL gave a positive review, stating "Despite the long-winded nature of the album, Uzi definitely got it right with Luv Is Rage 2. The songs are catchy, the beats are hot and Uzi gives a vocal performance that redefines the term rap rock star". Hip hop website HotNewHipHop stated that "Uzi is changed a person now, more weary of the world, less naively cheerful, and this is reflected on Luv Is Rage 2. If [they do] have a heart, it may soon be blackened. Uzi is feeling vindictive, rather than just being "happy to be here" (as [they were] on Luv Is Rage), [they're] looking, now, for admiration and acknowledgement that's deserved of [them]". Dan Weiss of Consequence said, "Nearly every song on Luv Is Rage 2 comes with a distinct enough hook to break up the limited set of things it does and subjects it ponders". In his review, Aaron McKrell of HipHopDX states, "Luv Is Rage 2 is proof that Lil Uzi Vert is simply an artist who succeeds in making music [they love], for people that hold tightly to [Uzi's] carpe-diem attitude". Corrigan B of Tiny Mix Tapes said, "The breadth of sounds covered will scan as inconsistency to all but the most pious Uzi devotees, but it's hard to imagine anything else serving as a more comprehensive document of rap in 2017".

Neil Z. Yeung of AllMusic said, "Although Uzi's post-breakup pain rears its head throughout the entirety of the album, many of the tracks are too fun to get too bogged down in emotions". Paul Thompson of Pitchfork stated that Luv Is Rage 2 is Lil Uzi Vert's "most musically developed work and features a bulk of [their] most interesting songs to date", as well as commending the subject matter and production, concluding: "Whether [they're] full of joy or howling into the void, [Uzi] pushes [their] songs to their edge, which helps to deliver on the promise shown in [Uzi's] earlier work. We knew Lil Uzi Vert would become one of rap's biggest stars, but Rage 2 suggests that [they] may spend [their] time on top experimenting rather than retreating to a comfort zone." Steve "Flash" Juon of RapReviews wrote: "As for today's singing rappers, Vert fits in comfortably next to the likes of Fetty Wap and French Montana, and I have little qualms with calling [Uzi] a better writer than the latter. The production is a little bit more of a mixed bag." In a mixed review, Sputnikmusic's Robert Lowe stated: "A lot of tracks start off OK, but [Uzi's] flow and style are so unfocused and muddled the songs become a chore to sit through."

Year-end lists

Commercial performance
Luv Is Rage 2 debuted at number one on the US Billboard 200 with 135,000 album-equivalent units, of which 28,000 were pure album sales. In its second week on the chart, Luv Is Rage 2 moved another 73,000 units bringing the total sales to 208,000. On March 19, 2019, the album was certified double platinum by the Recording Industry Association of America (RIAA) for combined sales, streaming and track-sale equivalents of two million units.

The album also entered at number 14 on the UK Albums Chart, selling 3,000 album-equivalent units in its first week.

Track listing

Notes
  signifies a co-producer
  signifies an uncredited co-producer
 "Two®" features additional vocals from Kesha Lee
 "The Way Life Goes" originally didn't credit featured vocals by Oh Wonder
 "How to Talk" features additional vocals from Dreamdoll
 "XO Tour Llif3" is stylized as "XO TOUR Llif3"

Sample credits
 "The Way Life Goes" contains a sample of "Landslide", written by Josephine Vander West and Anthony Vander West, as performed by Oh Wonder.

Personnel
Credits were adapted from the album's liner notes and Tidal.

Performers
 Lil Uzi Vert – primary artist
 Oh Wonder – featured artist (track 5)
 Pharrell Williams – featured artist (track 8)
 The Weeknd – featured artist (track 10)

Technical

 Kesha Lee – mixing engineer (tracks 1, 2, 9, 12, 17–20), recording engineer (tracks 1–9, 11-20)
 Chris Athens – mastering engineer (tracks 1–15)
 Don Cannon – mixing engineer (tracks 2, 9, 15, 20)
 Leslie Braithwaite – mixing engineer (tracks 3, 4, 6, 8, 11, 16)
 Jaycen Joshua – mixing engineer (tracks 5, 7, 10, 13, 14)
 Michael Piroli – mixer (tracks 3, 5)
 Ben Sedano – engineer (track 8)
 Jon Sher – engineer (track 8)
 Thomas Cullison – engineer (track 8)
 Mike Larson – recording engineer (track 8)
 Colin Leonard – mastering engineer (track 16)

Production

 Lil Uzi Vert – producer (track 1)
 Don Cannon – producer (tracks 1, 3, 4, 5, 10, 11)
 Lyle LeDuff – producer (track 1)
 Maaly Raw – producer (tracks 2, 9, 10, 15)
 Ike Beatz – producer (tracks 2, 5)
 BeldonDidThat – uncredited co-producer (track 3)
 Michael Piroli – uncredited co-producer (track 3)
 Cubeatz – producer (track 4)
 DJ Plugg – producer (track 6)
 Bobby Kritical – producer (tracks 6, 19)
 WondaGurl – producer (tracks 7, 12, 14)
 FrancisGotHeat – co-producer (track 7)
 Pharrell Williams – producer (track 8)
 DaHeala – producer (track 10)
 The Weeknd – producer (track 10)
 Illmind – producer (track 11)
 Metro Boomin – producer (track 13)
 Pi'erre Bourne – producer (track 13)
 Rex Kudo – producer (track 15)
 TM88 – producer (tracks 16, 18)
 JW Lucas – producer (track 16)
 D. Rich – producer (track 17)
 S1 – co-producer (track 18)
 Honorable C.N.O.T.E. – producer (track 20)

Additional personnel

 Don Cannon – executive producer
 DJ Drama – executive producer, album producer
 Leighton "LakeShow" Morrison – executive producer
 Ron Cabiltes – sample clearance
 Spike Jordan – photographer, art direction and design
 Matt Meiners – art direction and design

Charts

Weekly charts

Year-end charts

Decade-end charts

Certifications

Release history

See also
List of Billboard 200 number-one albums of 2017

References

2017 debut albums
Atlantic Records albums
Lil Uzi Vert albums
Albums produced by Pharrell Williams
Albums produced by Metro Boomin
Albums produced by Don Cannon
Albums produced by WondaGurl
Albums produced by Illmind
Albums produced by Symbolyc One
Albums produced by Honorable C.N.O.T.E.
Albums produced by Cubeatz
Albums produced by Pi'erre Bourne
Sequel albums
Albums produced by TM88